The 1996 Men's Hockey Champions Trophy, also known as the Kuber Champions Trophy for sponsorship reasons, was the 18th edition of the Hockey Champions Trophy men's field hockey tournament. It was held from 7–15 December 1996 in the newly built Mayor Radhakrishnan Stadium in Madras, India.

Host selection
India won the right to host the competition after Spain, the other contender, withdrew their bid in April 1994. The Asian Hockey Federation was tasked to monitor the competition by the International Hockey Federation.

Results

Pool

Classification

Fifth and sixth place

Third and fourth place

Final

Final standings

References

External links
Official FIH website

C
H
Champions Trophy (field hockey)
1996